Gina, Dale Haze and the Champions are an Irish pop group who formed in 1973 and remained a successful chart act for the next two decades. They were one of the most popular club acts in Ireland, playing on the showband circuit until their retirement in 1992. In 2009 they staged a reunion (with all the original members) and they continue to perform at selected venues around Ireland.

Background 

The group, originally from Cork, consisted of a four-piece backing band (The Champions) and two lead singers (Gina and Dale Haze). Female lead Gina (real name Mary Hurley) took the vocal duties on most of the singles, while male lead Dale Haze (real name Jerdie Mackey) provided lead vocals on many songs and released a solo album in 1982. Members of the backing group were Pat Walsh, Mossey Walsh, Eddie Fitzgerald and Tony Hornibrook.

They featured regularly in the Irish charts – their biggest hits including "Minnie Minnie", "Do You Wanna Do It", "You're the Greatest Lover", "Who Do You Wanna Be", "Give Me Back My Love"  and "Playing with Fire". They were voted Top Irish Pop Band in a number of voters polls over the period also. Briefly during 1985, they shortened their name to G, D H and C.

The group remained popular on the cabaret circuit and continued to play with the same line-up. In 1992 the group split due to the shift in popularity of the Irish showband genre and concert bookings began to dry up. Gina was also married to member Pat Walshe and after giving birth to her second child suffered post-natal depression and found it difficult to continue. The group never announced a split however and didn't perform a farewell gig. In October 2009, the original line-up reunited for an Irish tour, performing many of their hits. A night at the Cork Opera House was sold out three months in advance.  A compilation album The Best of Gina, Dale Haze and the Champions was released to tie in with this. In 2012 they released a new CD "Baby I Love You and re-mastered a number of their earlier hits to produce 3 new CDs.

Dale Haze, real name Jerdie Mackey, died suddenly on November 21st 2020. He was buried in his native Kilmacthomas Co Waterford.

Selected discography

Singles

NOTE: Last seven singles credited to Gina only

Albums

From the Beginning (1977)
Champions Again (1979)
Gina Dale Haze and the Champions (1981)
G D H and C (1986)
Hits and Memories
 Best of Gina Dale Haze and The Champions (2009)
 Baby I Love You (2012)
 Golden Memories Champions Revisited (2012)

Dale Haze also released a solo album in 1982 called A Real Good Feeling.

References

External links
 Official website
 Brief write up and Photos of the band at Irish Showbands.com
 Facebook Page

Irish pop music groups
Irish pop singers
Musical groups from Cork (city)
Musical groups established in 1973
Musical groups disestablished in 1992
Musical groups reestablished in 2009